Comeback is a 1982 semi-autobiographical film starring Eric Burdon, an English singer best known as a member and vocalist of rock band The Animals and of the funk rock band War, and for his aggressive stage performances. It was shot first in Los Angeles then in Berlin. In spring 1984, MGM released the film on VHS.

A soundtrack to the movie was also released in 1982, Comeback.

Premise
A once-famous blues singer whose career has taken a downturn tries to get back on top.

Cast

 Eric Burdon as Rocco
 Julie Carmen as Tina
 Michael Cavanaugh as The Manager
 John Aprea as Lawyer
 Louisiana Red as "Louisiana"
 Jorg Pfennigwerth as Paul
 Blackie Dammett as "Heavy"
 Edwin Craig as "Freak"
 Emily Woods as Laura
 Bob Lockwood as Marilyn
 Rosa King as Rosa
 Blair Ashleigh as Liz
 Dan van Husen as Zuhaelter / Pimp
 Harry Hart-Browne as "Nada", Coffeeshop Counterman

External links 
 

1982 films
1982 drama films